Fearless is a six-part British crime thriller television drama series created by screenwriter Patrick Harbinson and broadcast on ITV in 2017. The series follows human-rights lawyer Emma Banville (Helen McCrory) as she tries to prove convicted murderer Kevin Russell innocent of the murder of schoolgirl Linda Simms 14 years earlier. Russell asserts that he is innocent of the crime, and Emma believes that his conviction was a miscarriage of justice. She goes to extreme lengths to discover the truth.

Supporting cast includes Michael Gambon as  influential former Deputy Secretary to the Cabinet Office Sir Alastair McKinnon, Jonathan Forbes as Emma's colleague Dominic Truelove, Wunmi Mosaku as DCS Olivia Greenwood, the Investigating Officer on the Linda Simms case, and John Bishop as Emma's boyfriend Steve Livesey.

Filming for the series began in September 2016 in London and East Anglia. The series debuted on ITV in the UK on 12 June 2017 and has received positive reviews, with critics praising Helen McCrory's performance. However, the show was cancelled in March 2018 after one series.

Cast

Main cast 
 Helen McCrory as Emma Banville, an experienced human rights lawyer
 Jonathan Forbes as Dominic Truelove, a former police officer and Banville's legal assistant
 Sam Swainsbury as Kevin Russell, a 37-year-old man who insists he was wrongly imprisoned for 14 years for the murder of Linda Simms
 Rebecca Callard as Annie Peterson, Kevin's former fiancée and the mother of his son
 Wunmi Mosaku as DCS Olivia Greenwood, a Counter Terrorism Command officer who previously led the Simms murder investigation
 Robin Weigert as Heather Myles, a Central Intelligence Agency operative
 John Bishop as Steve Livesey, Banville's photographer boyfriend
 Jamie Bamber as Matthew Wild MP, a young politician and former soldier who later becomes Leader of the Opposition
 Emma Hamilton as Laura Wild, wife of Matthew Wild 
 Michael Gambon as Sir Alastair McKinnon, the former Deputy Secretary to the Cabinet under Prime Minister Tony Blair.

Supporting cast 
 Eve Austin as Linda Simms, the 15-year-old girl murdered in 2003
 Rick Warden as Charlie Simms, father of Linda
 Cathy Murphy as Beth Simms, mother of Linda
 Ben Cartwright as Phil Simms, uncle of Linda
 Jack Hollington as Jason, the 14-year-old son of Kevin Russell and Annie Peterson
 Christine Bottomley as DS Jenna Brooks, a Counter Terrorism Command officer
 Karima McAdams as Miriam Attar, Syrian wife of a suspected terrorist and friend of Banville
 Alec Newman as Tony Pullings, a photojournalist 
 Allan Corduner as Monty Berman
 Jemima Rooper as Maggie Berman
 Brendan Patricks as DCI Nicholas Staines, a Metropolitan Police Service detective
 Armin Karima as Imran
 Colin Stinton as Jack Kretchmer, the former US Under Secretary of Defense under President George W. Bush 
 Catherine Steadman as Karen Buxton
 Dhaffer L'Abidine as Dr. Yusef Attar, one of Banville's clients suspected of having ties to ISIS
 Tim McMullan as David Nolenn
 Pandora Clifford as Nicola Osborne
 Jack Shepherd as Arthur Banville, Emma's terminally ill father
 Kika Markham as Eleanor Banville, Emma's mother
 James Thorne as Derek Peterson, Annie's husband and Jason's stepfather
 Sam Crane as Luke
 Sammy Winward as Siobhan Murphy
 Corey Johnson as Larry Arlman, an American private investigator used by Banville and her colleagues
 Jonah Lotan as Logan Bradley, a member of the United States Air Force

Episodes

References

External links

2017 British television series debuts
2017 British television series endings
2010s British crime television series
2010s British drama television series
2010s British television miniseries
ITV television dramas
Television series by Mammoth Screen
Television series by ITV Studios
English-language television shows
Television series about adoption
Wrongful convictions in fiction